Beppo Brem (11 March 1906 in Munich, German Empire – September 5, 1990 in Munich, West Germany) was a German film actor, who was in over 200 film and television productions between 1932 and 1990. He often played stereotypically Bavarian characters, but managed to find respect as a character actor in later years.

Selected filmography
 The Bartered Bride (1932)
 The Tunnel (1933)
 Must We Get Divorced? (1933)
 Um das Menschenrecht (1934)
 The Young Baron Neuhaus (1934)
 The Switched Bride (1934)
  Marriage Strike (1935)
 Knockout (1935)
 The King's Prisoner (1935)
  The Saint and Her Fool (1935)
 Donogoo Tonka (1936)
 The Three Around Christine (1936)
 Home Guardsman Bruggler (1936)
 The Last Four on Santa Cruz (1936)
 Unternehmen Michael (1937)
 Meiseken (1937)
 Anna Favetti (1938)
 Frau Sixta (1938)
 The Deruga Case (1938)
 Water for Canitoga (1939)
  Three Fathers for Anna (1939)
 Enemies (1940)
 The Sinful Village (1940)
 Quax the Crash Pilot (1941)
 Above All Else in the World (1941)
 Melody of a Great City (1943)
 Wild Bird (1943)
 Kohlhiesel's Daughters (1943)
 Quax in Africa (1947)
 In the Temple of Venus (1948)
 After the Rain Comes Sunshine (1949)
 Theodore the Goalkeeper (1950)
 Regimental Music (1950)
 Everything for the Company (1950)
  Two in One Suit (1950)
 Sensation in Savoy (1950)
 Royal Children (1950)
  Trouble in Paradise (1950)
 Fanfares of Love (1951)
 Once on the Rhine (1952)
 When the Heath Dreams at Night (1952)
 Three Days of Fear (1952)
  Monks, Girls and Hungarian Soldiers (1952)
 Two People (1952)
  Carnival in White (1952)
  Marriage Strike (1953)
 Elephant Fury (1953)
 Not Afraid of Big Animals (1953)
  The Mill in the Black Forest (1953)
 The Night Without Morals (1953)
 The Sinful Village (1954)
  The Fisherman from Heiligensee (1955)
 Operation Sleeping Bag (1955)
 The Forest House in Tyrol (1955)
 One Woman Is Not Enough? (1955)
 Winter in the Woods (1956)
 Two Bavarians in St. Pauli (1956)
 The Hunter from Roteck (1956)
 The Stolen Trousers (1956)
 I'll See You at Lake Constance (1956)
  (1957)
 Two Bavarians in the Harem (1957)
 Between Munich and St. Pauli (1957)
 Two Bavarians in the Jungle (1957)
 Candidates for Marriage (1958)
 My Ninety Nine Brides (1958)
 The Domestic Tyrant (1959)
 Agatha, Stop That Murdering! (1960)
 Season in Salzburg (1961)
 Two Bavarians in Bonn (1962)
 Homesick for St. Pauli (1963)
 Tonio Kröger (1964)
 The Merry Wives of Tyrol (1964)
 Aunt Frieda (1965)
 Die seltsamen Methoden des Franz Josef Wanninger (1965–1982, TV series, 112 episodes)
 The Sinful Village (1966)
 When Ludwig Goes on Manoeuvres (1967)
 Hugo, the Woman Chaser (1969)
 Holidays in Tyrol (1971)
 My Father, the Ape and I (1971)
 Don't Get Angry (1972)
 The Hunter of Fall (1974)
  (1977)

References

External links
 

1906 births
1990 deaths
German male film actors
German male television actors
Male actors from Munich
Officers Crosses of the Order of Merit of the Federal Republic of Germany
20th-century German male actors